Learning to Skateboard in a Warzone (if you're a girl) is a 2019 British documentary short film directed by Carol Dysinger and produced by Elena Andreicheva. It won the Academy Award for Best Documentary Short Subject at the 92nd Academy Awards.

Summary 

The film is about Skateistan, a nonprofit organization, which started as a skate school in 2007 for girls from impoverished neighborhoods learning to read, write, and skateboard in Kabul, Afghanistan, where young women are not allowed to participate in sporting activities.

Awards

Academy Awards

BAFTA

See also 

 2019 in film
 Culture of Afghanistan
 Skateboarding

References

External links 

 
 Learning to Skateboard in a Warzone (If You're a Girl) at A&E
 Skateistan's page on the film
 Trailer

2019 films
British short documentary films
Best Documentary Short Subject Academy Award winners
Skateboarding films
Films set in Afghanistan
Documentary films about education
Education in Afghanistan
Documentary films about the War in Afghanistan (2001–2021)
Documentary films about women in Afghanistan
Women's sport in Afghanistan
British sports documentary films
2010s British films
2019 short documentary films